Kenzie Paige is an American professional wrestler. She is currently signed to the National Wrestling Alliance (NWA) where she is a former NWA World Women's Tag Team Champion as a member of Pretty Empowered.

Professional wrestling career
Paige made her national TV debut on the May 6, 2020 episode of AEW Dynamite losing to Nyla Rose in a squash match.

On the June 15, 2021 episode of NWA Powerrr, Paige made her NWA debut, losing to Melina in a three-way match which also involved Jennacide. Her next match was on the August 3 episode of Powerrr where, during the Champions Series, she defeated Lady Frost, marking Paige's first win in NWA. During the NWA EmPowerrr pre-show, she lost to Paola Blaze (accompanied by Taryn Terrell) in a match that didn't air due to technical issues. At By Any Means Necessary, Paige faced Kamille in a two-out-of-three falls match for the NWA World Women's Championship only to lose the match two to none.

On March 20, 2022 at the Crockett Cup, Ella Envy and Paige, under the name Pretty Empowered, made their NWA debut together, losing to the NWA World Women's Tag Team Champions The Hex. On June 11, at Alwayz Ready, Pretty Empowered defeated the Hex to win the World Women's Tag Team Championships. This would lead them to a rematch against The Hex on the NWA 74th Anniversary Show for said championships, successfully defending in a Street Fight where Paige also turned heel alongside Envy. On September 27, at Pretty Empowered Surge in which they hosted, Envy and Paige introduced Roxy as their third member of Pretty Empowered.

On December 24, 2022, at NWA Christmas Special, Envy and Paige defeated The Renegade Twins who had made their NWA debut. On the February 7, 2023 episode of NWA Powerrr, Envy and Roxy lost to the Renegade Twins, which earned the latter a title shot at Nuff Said. On February 11, at Nuff Said, the Envy and Paige lost their NWA World Women's Tag Team Championship bout to the Renegade Twins by pinfall.

Championships and accomplishments
National Wrestling Alliance
NWA World Women's Tag Team Championship (1 time) – with Ella Envy
New South Pro Wrestling
New South Championship (1 time, current)
New South Tag Team Championship (2 times) – with Dillon McQueen (1) and Ella Envy (1)
 Pro Wrestling Illustrated
 Ranked No. 71 of the top 100 Tag Teams in the PWI Tag Team 100 in 2022 – with Ella Envy
Ranked No. 360 of the top 500 singles wrestlers in the PWI 500 in 2022

References

External links

Date of birth missing (living people)
Living people
Professional wrestlers from Tennessee
American female professional wrestlers
21st-century professional wrestlers